Colt is a masculine given name which may refer to:

People
Colt Anderson (born 1985), American football player
Colt Brennan (1983–2021), American football player
Colt David (born 1985), American football player
Colt Knost (born 1985), American golfer
Colt McCoy (born 1986), American football quarterback with the Washington Redskins
Colt Walker (born 2001), American artistic gymnast

Fictional characters
Colt (Hunter × Hunter), a character in the manga series Hunter × Hunter
Colt Seavers, title character of the 1981 TV show The Fall Guy
Colt Wilcox, a character in the 1987 animated TV series Saber Rider and the Star Sheriffs
Colt Reagan Bennet, a character in the 2016 Netflix series The Ranch
Colt Grice, a character in the manga series Attack On Titan
Colt Fathom, a posthumous character in the cartoon Miraculous: Tales of Ladybug & Cat Noir

See also
Colt (disambiguation)
Colt (surname)

Masculine given names